The Sm4 electric multiple unit (EMU) is a low-floor train used by the VR Group for longer-distance Helsinki commuter rail services. The initial order was for ten EMUs with the first unit entering service in 1999. Another 20 units were ordered in 2002 and the deliveries were completed in 2005. The Spanish company CAF was contracted to manufacture the units, based on a design by Alstom.

Features
The Sm4 EMU consists of two powered cars, each equipped with a pantograph. The unit is capable of regenerative braking and can thereby save up to 30% of the electrical energy that would otherwise be consumed. The unit offers a good level of passenger comfort with a quiet and smooth ride quality. The Sm4 passenger compartments are fitted with air conditioning, CCTV cameras and display screens that can be used to show e.g. route information. The units have partly low floors with all of the entrances at platform level, and they are equipped with toilets accessible to the disabled. There are racks for bicycles in the entrance vestibules nearest to the driver's cabins.
Trains are usually formed of two units, but also only one and up to four in the peak hours, when traffic is too high to increase capacity by higher frequency of trains. This allows for a flexible handling of varying passenger traffic. The maximum number of connected units is five.

Routes
 

The Sm4 is designed for longer-distance trips than typical metro-like local services. The Sm4 units have largely replaced the older Sm1 and Sm2 units on commuter services from Helsinki to Riihimäki and Lahti. The units are also used in commuter traffic on the Tampere–Riihimäki and Riihimäki–Kouvola routes. The Sm4s were also  used for the shorter, frequently-stopping services because of the lack of more suitable low floor trains. The new Sm5 low floor trains that started to enter commercial service in November 2009 have completely replaced the Sm4 units on the short routes.

Nickname
Some railway enthusiasts use the nickname Pupu ("Bunny") for Sm4.

References

External links 
 

Multiple units of Finland
25 kV AC multiple units
CAF multiple units
Alstom multiple units
Alstom Coradia